The Civil Jurisdiction and Judgments Act 1991 is an Act of Parliament made by the Parliament of the United Kingdom in order to implement the Lugano Convention of 1988 into British law.

Contracting states in 1991
In addition to the contracting states to the Brussels Convention over which the Civil Jurisdiction and Judgments Act 1982 gave the UK courts jurisdiction, the contracting states to the Lugano Convention were the members of the European Free Trade Association who were not members of the European Economic Community (now European Union); namely Austria, Finland, Iceland, Norway, Sweden and Switzerland. Poland became a contracting state when it signed the Lugano Convention in 2000.

See also 
 Civil Jurisdiction and Judgments Act 1982

References

External links
Text of Act from legislation.gov.uk
Discussion of Act by a committee of the UK Parliament

United Kingdom Acts of Parliament 1991
Conflict of laws